Adlersky City District is the southernmost of four city districts of the city of Sochi in Krasnodar Krai, Russia, lying along the Black Sea coast near the southern Russian border with Georgia. The city district borders Maykopsky District of Adygea in the north, Mostovsky District of Krasnodar Krai in the east, Abkhazia in the south, and Khostinsky City District in the northwest. In the southwest, it is bordered by the Black Sea. Population:  Adlersky District was chosen to host the 2014 Winter Olympics.

The historical center of the district is Adler Microdistrict — formerly classified as a town, but today a microdistrict of Adlersky City District—located at the mouth of the Mzymta River.

History
The settlement was founded by Russians on 18 June 1837 as the fort of Svyatoy Dukh (Holy Spirit). However, this area had been inhabited long before the Russian arrival. During the Middle Ages, it was the site of Liesh, a Sadz Abkhazian village. In the 13th century, the Genoese merchants arrived to establish a factory which became known as Layso. At that time the upland area was controlled by the Sadz princes of Aredba, one of whose principal estates was located within the modern district boundaries. The current name was given to the area by the Ottoman Turks, who called it either Artlar or Artı.

In 2019, an area in Imereti Lowlands was cut out from Adlersky City District and incorporated separately as the urban-type settlement of Sirius. It was later designated as a federal territory.

Transportation
Adler is home to the Sochi International Airport, which serves the whole Greater Sochi area.

Adler railway station is also the effective southern terminus of the Russian section of the North Caucasus Railway, which has ceased to carry international traffic to Georgia since hostilities between Russia and Georgia closed the cross-border line in 1992. The summer months see direct train services bringing visitors to Adler from as far away as Berlin in the west (a journey of 3,714 km), Vorkuta in the north (4,286 km away, beyond the Arctic Circle), and Khabarovsk in the Russian Far East, with the 9,816 km of the latter journey taking eight days to complete. Passenger service to Sukhumi starts and stops from time to time.

For the 2014 Winter Olympics, new suburban network was put in operation. There is currently infrequent suburban service to Sochi, with most of the trains stopping also in Khosta and Matsesta, both in Khostinsky City District. The service continues in the direction of Abkhazian border, where trains stop at Olympiyskaya Derevnya railway platform. The service terminates at Olympiysky Park train station. Both the station and the platform were constructed for the Olympics. Furthermore, a connection to the airport is open, with regular service to Sochi through Adler railway station. Finally, a new line was constructed between Adler and Krasnaya Polyana, where some of the Olympic competitions were held, with two railway stations, Esto-Sadok and Roza Khutor. Kudepsta railway platform has been disused. Vesyoloye railway station is only in operation when there is passenger traffic to Abkhazia; at this station, customs and border controls take place.

Buses connect Adler with other localities of the city of Sochi.

Landmarks
The Fisht Olympic Stadium and associated facilities are located closer to the shore.

The landmarks of the former town of Adler include two Russian Orthodox churches, dedicated to the Holy Trinity and the Holy Ghost, as well as the Armenian Saint Sarkis Cathedral.

Apart from a pebbly and narrow beach backed by the railway line, the district also has a municipal historical museum and a dolphinarium, which makes it popular among tourists. It is also possible to visit the largest trout farm in Russia (founded in 1964) and a breeding nursery for great apes.

Among the natural wonders of the district are the 70-metre-high Polikarya waterfall and the Akhshtyr Gorge with a 160-meter-long cave which contains traces of human habitation about 30,000 years ago.

References

External links

Adlersky City District administration official site

 
City districts of Sochi
Seaside resorts in Russia
Armenian diaspora communities
Armenian diaspora in Russia
Georgia (country)–Russia border crossings
States and territories established in 1961